Wuilito Paulo Tavares Fernandes (born 23 March 1990), also known as Totti, is a Cape Verdean football player who plays as a midfielder or forward.

Career
In 2009, Fernandes moved to the United States, where his mother lived, having spent time with Bairro FC in his native Cape Verde. He had an unsuccessful trial with New York Red Bulls in 2010.

Fernandes played four years of college soccer at the University of Massachusetts Lowell between 2013 and 2016, scoring 25 goals in 65 appearances and tallying 10 assists.

On 17 January 2017, Fernandes was drafted in the third round (62nd overall) of the 2017 MLS SuperDraft by FC Dallas.

Fernandes signed with United Soccer League side Orange County SC in April 2017.

Fernandes signed with USL side North Carolina FC in January 2018.

References

External links

1990 births
Living people
Cape Verdean footballers
Cape Verde international footballers
Sportspeople from Praia
AD Bairro players
UMass Lowell River Hawks men's soccer players
Orange County SC players
North Carolina FC players
Association football forwards
FC Dallas draft picks
USL Championship players
All-American men's college soccer players